The North American NA-64 (NA-64 P-2 or NAA-64 P-2 in French service, Yale in Canadian service) is a low-wing single piston engine monoplane advanced trainer aircraft that was built for the French Air Force and French Navy, served with the Royal Canadian Air Force, and with the Luftwaffe as a captured aircraft during World War II.

Design and development
Ordered as a follow-on to the NA-57 as a two-seat advanced trainer, the NA-64 P-2/NAA-64 P-2 represented a major structural improvement, with a longer all-metal fuselage replacing the fabric covered fuselage of the NA-57. As well as metal skin replacing the fabric on the fuselage, the fin was changed from having a corrugated skin to being a smooth stressed skin structure and was moved slightly aft, lengthening the rear fuselage while the engine was moved forward to maintain the center of gravity. The rudder was also changed from the rounded shape used previously to one with a roughly triangular shape with the broadest part being at the bottom to improve handling at high angles of attack. In one respect however, it was a step backwards from its immediate predecessor, the BT-14, with which it is often confused, in that the earlier straight wings were used with the result that in RCAF service, when compared to the later and more powerful Harvard II it was flown alongside, it had different handling characteristics and lower performance.

Operational history

France

The NA-64 P-2 was built for the French Armée de l'Air and Aéronavale in 1939–1940, which ordered 200 and 30 respectively. Of these, 111 had been delivered before France surrendered to the Germans after the Battle of France. In France, the NA-64, like the NA-57 before it, was known as the North, and was designated as NAA-64 P-2 (abbreviated from North American Aviation modèle 64 perfectionnement, 2 places (North American Aviation model 64 advanced trainer, 2 seats)) but were sometimes attached to reconnaissance units. A small number escaped the Germans to be used by the Vichy French Air Force. Two examples in North Africa survived into the postwar years, having been operated alongside NA-57s, the last only being retired in 1949.

Canada

The remaining 119 undelivered aircraft were bought up by the British Purchasing Commission and transferred to the Royal Canadian Air Force (RCAF) for the British Commonwealth Air Training Plan between August and September 1940, and all were operational by November The type was named the Yale Mk.I following British naming practice of naming trainers after education institutions and US-supplied aircraft after American locations, in this case, Yale University, and were used initially as intermediate pilot trainers taking pilots from the de Havilland Tiger Moth and Fleet Finch to the much faster and more complex North American Harvard, until this category was dispensed with as being unnecessary. They were then relegated for use as airborne wireless radio trainers, along with the contemporary Fleet Fort intermediate trainer in 1943. Prior to service entry, the throttle and engine mixture controls were modified from the system used by the French whereby the throttle was pulled back to increase power, and the mixture control pulled back to lean out the mixture, to the system used on the Harvard. The Yale appeared in the movie Captains of the Clouds. The RCAF sold all surviving examples off as scrap in 1946 but over 30 survive today as a result of a large number of them being bought surplus by a single farmer, with about 15 currently in airworthy condition.

Germany
The NAA-64s captured from the French were used by the German Luftwaffe for all types of flight training, from basic flying to advanced fighter tactics. Dive bomber schools and target tug units and even combat squadrons all used the NAA-64, as they were designated by the Luftwaffe, from the tail markings of the French examples. At least one was used by the Zirkus Rosarius to familiarize German aircrew with the handling of American aircraft before they evaluated captured aircraft.

Operators

 Royal Canadian Air Force
No.1 Service Flying Training School (No. 1 SFTS) Borden
No.2 Service Flying Training School (No. 2 SFTS) Uplands
No.6 Service Flying Training School (No. 6 SFTS) Dunnville
No.14 Service Flying Training School (No. 14 SFTS) Aylmer
No.1 Training Command (1TC) Toronto, ON
No.3 Training Command (3TC) Montreal
No.4 Training Command (4TC) Regina
No.1 Flying Instructor School (1FIS) Trenton
No.1 Wireless School (1WS) Winnipeg, MB
No.2 Wireless School (2WS) Calgary, AB
No.3 Wireless School (3WS) Montreal, QC
No.4 Wireless School (4WS), Guelph
No.12 (Communications) Squadron

French Air Force (Armée de l'Air)
Escadrille d'Outre Mer 82 Niger (post-WWII)
French Navy (Marine Nationale)
French Naval Aviation (Aéronavale)
Section Liaison Port Lyautey 51 S squadron (Khouribga)
Vichy French Air Force (Armée de l'Air de Vichy)
Groupe de Chasse II/9 (fighter-trainer) – Aulnat
Free French Air Force (Forces Aériennes Françaises Libres)s

Luftwaffe captured 93 aircraft and assigned 96 registrations, and they published their own pilots manual for it
Fliegerzielgeschwader Fl.Z.G. 2 target towing wing

Flugzeugführerschule A/B 9 pilot school
Flugzeugführerschule A/B 16 pilot school
Flugzeugführerschule A/B 42 pilot school
Flugzeugführerschule A/B 43 pilot school
Flugzeugführerschule A/B 71 pilot school
Flugzeugführerschule A/B 82 pilot school
Flugzeugführerschule A/B 110 pilot school
Flugzeugführerschule A/B 111 pilot school
Flugzeugführerschule A/B 116 Göppingen pilot school
Flugzeugführerschule A/B 117 pilot school
Jagdfliegerschule JFS 2 Neustadt Weinstraße/Speyerdorf advanced fighter pilot school
Jagdfliegerschule JFS 6 advanced fighter pilot training school
Jagdfliegervorschule JFVS 2 Lachen-Speyerdorf preliminary fighter pilot school
Jagdgeschwader JG 103 fighter squadron
Jagdgeschwader JG 106 fighter squadron
Luftdienst-Kommando 7 air service command
Luftkriegschule LKS 1 air war school
Luftkriegschule LKS 5 air war school
Nahaufklärungsgeschwader NAG 102 short-range reconnaissance wing

Stukaschule StS 1 Wertheim dive bomber school
Sturzkampffliegervorschule StVS 1 Bad Aibling preliminary dive bomber school
Stukavorschule SVS 2 preliminary dive bomber school
Zerstörerschule ZS 1 Neubiberg heavy fighter school
Zieldarstellungsstaffel ZD-Stf 102 target towing squadron
Zirkus Rosarius used to familiarize aircrew with U.S. aircraft.

 Royal Navy 
31 SFTS Kingston, ON (Canada) – eight loaned from RCAF from March to April 1941 in exchange for eight Fairey Battle trainers.

Surviving aircraft

There are many surviving NA-64 Yales today because of Ernie Simmons, a farmer from near Tillsonburg, Ontario.  Simmons bought 39 Yales in 1946, along with seven Fairey Swordfish and a Westland Lysander and kept them on his farm until he died in 1970. Most were auctioned the same year, and many have been restored by museums and warbird enthusiasts. Most surviving Yales are from the Simmons collection, but there are at least six surviving Yales that came from Western Canada. Three Yales have been subsequently lost, a major hangar fire took the Musée de l'air et de l'espace's NA-64 3415/64-2224, and 3454/64-2165 & 3395/64-2159 were destroyed as the result of flying accidents. Several Yales have been painted or partially modified as BT-14s.
Additionally, over a dozen are privately owned in Canada, the US, and Europe or are not accessible, and additional airframes may be held by some museums as a source of spares.

Specifications

See also

References

Notes

Bibliography

External links

Warbirds Directory – North American T-6 and Yale
IMdB – Captains of the Clouds

NA-64
Single-engined tractor aircraft
Low-wing aircraft